Ediba is a village in Abi local government area of Cross River State, Nigeria.

This place is situated in Abi, Cross River, Nigeria, its geographical coordinates are 5° 52' 0" North, 8° 1' 0" East and its original name (with diacritics) is Ediba.

The Ediba people speak Bahumono.

Ediba has several wards which includes Barracks, Enihom, Enusokwe, Enobom, Enugwehuma and Ezono.

Ediba is bordered on its four sides by Itigidi, Afafanyi, Anong and Usumutong.

The Village is headed by its Traditional Ruler, Ovai Uvara Imong Anani who ascended the throne in 2016.

There are three secondary schools in Ediba, two of these schools are privately owned while the third is owned by the government.

References 

Villages in Cross River State